Magic Holidays is a brand belonging to Panoramic Holidays Ltd. (PHL).  PHL is a timeshare company, part of Panoramic Group. It was founded in 2009 to provide holidays on a timeshare basis. Magic Holidays has over 37 hotels & resorts in India and abroad. In 2013, it was reported that the company is working towards building and acquiring additional resorts around the world. Magic Holidays is an affiliate of Resorts Condominium International (RCI),  the largest timeshare vacation exchange network in the world. Magic Holidays has access to properties in more than 103 countries.

History
Panoramic Holidays Ltd., (PHL) is a part of the hospitality vertical of the Panoramic Group. Founded in 2009, Magic Holidays currently has over 8387 members (approx. number) and more than 37 hotels & resorts in India and abroad.

Hotels and resorts in India
 United 21 – Thane
 Panoramic Resort – Karnala
 Pancard Club – Pune
 Hotel Sai Sahavas – Shirdi
 Hotel Sagar Kinara – Malvan
 Graciano Cottages – Goa
 United 21 Resort – Mahabaleshwar
 United 21 – Mysore
 United 21 Resort – Kodaikanal
 Panoramic Sea Resort – Alleppey
 United 21 Grassland – Kaziranga
 United 21 Resort – Sunderbans
 United 21 Nature Paradise – Bhimtal
 United 21 Wildlife Resort – Corbett
 United 21 Resort – Chail
 United 21 – Tiger’s Habitat – Kanha
 United 21 – Jungle Resort – Pench
 United 21 – Royal Resort – Todgarh
 United 21 – Hyderabad
 United 21 – Vanvaso – Gir
 United 21 Retreat – Lonavala
 United 21 Island Resort – Kollam
 United 21 Lake City Resort – Udaipur
 United – 21 Emerald – Goa
 United – 21 Beach view – Mandarmoni

Hotels and resorts abroad
 Clarion Inn – Hudson, Ohio – USA
 Baymont Inn & Suites – North Carolina – USA
 The Georgian Resort – New York City – USA
 Econo Lodge – North Carolina – USA
 Regal Palms Resort Development, Orlando, Florida – USA
 Sai Motels – Auckland – New Zealand
 AD Condominium Hyatt – Pattaya – Thailand
 Patong Tower – Phuket – Thailand
 St. Thomas Lodge – Singapore
 Andaman Beach Condominium – Phuket – Thailand

References

Hospitality companies of India
Companies based in Mumbai
Indian companies established in 2009
2009 establishments in Maharashtra
Hospitality companies established in 2009